The Open Nouvelle-Calédonie (formerly known as Internationaux de Nouvelle-Calédonie) is a professional tennis tournament played on outdoor hard courts. It is currently part of the ATP Challenger Tour. It has been held annually in Nouméa, New Caledonia since 2004 ($37.500 for 2004)

Past finals

Singles

Doubles

External links
Official website
ITF Search

ATP Challenger Tour
Hard court tennis tournaments
Recurring sporting events established in 2005
Sport in New Caledonia
Tennis tournaments in France
Internationaux de Nouvelle-Calédonie